John Carey (born April 18, 1959) is an American politician in the Republican Party. He became the Chancellor of the University System of Ohio in 2013. In 2011, he served as a member of the Ohio House of Representatives, representing the 87th District, before resigning at the end of the year. He also was a member of the Ohio House of Representatives from 1995 until 2002, and the Ohio Senate from 2003 to 2010.

Career
Carey graduated from Wellston High School and attended Ohio University, where he earned a degree in political science. After college, he worked as an aide to U.S. Representative Clarence Miller and served as Mayor of Wellston from 1988 to 1994.

Carey defeated incumbent Representative Mark Malone in 1994 to take his first term in the Ohio House of Representatives, and won reelection handily in 1996. In 1998, Carey defeated Democrat Bill Oiler with 64.97% of the electorate to take a third term. For his fourth term in 2000, he ran unopposed.

Term limited in the House after 2002, Carey sought to face incumbent Senator Mike Shoemaker to move up to the Ohio Senate. While the seat had been held by Democrats since the mid-1980s, redistricting made the seat solidly Republican. He defeated Shoemaker to take his first term with 53.8% of the vote.

For the 126th General Assembly, Senate President Bill Harris named Carey as Chairman of the Senate Finance Committee, and he continued to serve in the capacity for the 127th and 128th General Assemblies.

For his reelection bid in 2006, Carey faced Democrat April Howland, but easily won reelection with 60.08% of the vote.

Ohio House of Representatives, Second Tenure
Again term limited, Carey returned to the Ohio House in 2010, and ran to succeed Clyde Evans. He went on to win the seat with 64.19% of the vote.

Carey served as vice chairman of the House Finance and Financial Institutions Committee, under Chairman Ron Amstutz, and as Chairman of the Primary and Secondary Education Subcommittee in the 129th General Assembly. He also served on the committee of Agriculture and Natural Resources. Carey is also a member of the Lawrence County Transportation Improvement District Board of Trustees.

House initiatives and positions

Education 
With Carey a key player in Ohio education reform as Chairman of the Primary and Secondary Education Subcommittee, Carey is leading an effort to reform Ohio school funding, and to change the current evidence based model. While he supports some changes, he believes the overall formula is set up fair.

After the most recent budget bill adjusted the number of calamity days school districts can use each year from five to three, there was great concern from school districts citing costs. Carey introduced legislation, along with Casey Kozlowski, that would allow for five calamity days starting as early as the present school year. He stated that bring the available days back up to three allows for education needs to be met while also ensuring safety for students.

Finance 
As vice chairman of the Finance Committee, Carey was responsible for appropriating the privatization of the Ohio Department of Development.  While it is a controversial approach, Carey has stated, "What we're doing now isn't working," he said about the state's existing job creation programs. "We need to take a step, even though there are risks involved. But I think we need to take these risks to help our constituents." Carey has also been adement about being cautious with local government funds.

An opponent of the estate tax, Carey has claimed that jobs have been lost in his district as a result of the taxation, and is in favor of initiatives to abolish the tax.

Carey was a member of the conference committee on the 2013-2014 budget.  The goal of a conference committee is to discuss differences between the House and Senate versions of the budget legislation and decide on a common solution.

References

External links
Project Vote Smart - Senator John A. Carey Jr. (OH) profile
Follow the Money - John A Carey Jr
2010 20082006 2004 2002 2000 1998 1996 campaign contributions

Chancellors of the University System of Ohio
Republican Party Ohio state senators
Republican Party members of the Ohio House of Representatives
1959 births
Living people
21st-century American politicians
People from Chillicothe, Ohio
People from Wellston, Ohio